Thomas Dorn Stincic (born November 24, 1946) is a former American football linebacker in the National Football League (NFL) for the Dallas Cowboys and New Orleans Saints. He played college football, principally as a linebacker, at the University of Michigan from 1966 to 1968.

Remembered as a loving father, husband, grandfather, brother and uncle, he is in the hearts of all those that loved him.

Early years
A native of Cleveland, Ohio, Stincic attended John Marshall High School.

College career
Stincic enrolled at the University of Michigan in 1965 and played football for the Michigan Wolverines football team from 1966 to 1968. From the start he was recognized for his leadership qualities. As a sophomore in 1966, he saw limited action in four games.

As a junior in 1967, Stincic started two games at defensive end and four games at linebacker. He had a career-high ten tackles against Illinois.

As a senior, he totaled 55 tackles and 47 assists as a starting linebacker for the 1968 Michigan Wolverines football team that compiled an 8–2 record and finished ranked No. 12 in the final AP Poll.  He received All-Big Ten honors in both 1967 and 1968.

Professional football

Dallas Cowboys
Stincic was selected by the Dallas Cowboys in the third round (68th overall pick) of the 1969 NFL Draft. He spent three seasons serving as the backup to middle linebacker Lee Roy Jordan, appearing in 35 games, and playing with the Super Bowl VI championship team.

After three years as a backup in Dallas, he asked to be traded. On July 17, 1972, he was sent to the New Orleans Saints in exchange for a third-round draft choice (#53-Harvey Martin).

New Orleans Saints
Stincic appeared in seven games, four as a starter, for the Saints during the 1972 season. On March 20, 1973, Stincic was traded to the Houston Oilers along with Dave Parks and Edd Hargett, in exchange for Ron Billingsley and Kent Nix.
He decided to retire after not reaching a contract agreement with the Houston Oilers.

Coaching and teaching career
Stincic coached high school football and taught social studies and science at Chaparral High School in Scottsdale, Arizona in the 1980s, including coaching the football team to the state playoffs in 1985.  He taught science at Mountain View High School in Mesa, Arizona in the 2000s.

References

1946 births
2021 deaths
American football linebackers
Dallas Cowboys players
Houston Oilers players
Michigan Wolverines football players
New Orleans Saints players
High school football coaches in Arizona
Players of American football from Cleveland